Maxwell Pym Ritchie (4 November 1934 – 28 July 2018) was an Australian rules footballer who played with North Melbourne in the Victorian Football League (VFL).

Notes

External links 

		
1934 births
2018 deaths
Australian rules footballers from New South Wales
North Melbourne Football Club players